The Distelhorn is a mountain of the Swiss Pennine Alps, overlooking Grächen in the canton of Valais.

References

External links
 Distelhorn on Hikr

Mountains of the Alps
Mountains of Switzerland
Mountains of Valais
Two-thousanders of Switzerland